William Legh Sherwin (1839–1873) was an English cricketer.  Sherwin's batting style is unknown.  He was born at Petworth, Sussex.

Sherwin made two first-class appearances for Sussex, both against Kent in 1861.  In the first match against Kent at Royal Brunswick Ground, Hove, Sherwin was run out for a duck in Sussex's first-innings, while in their second-innings he was dismissed by Edgar Willsher for a single run.  Kent won the match by 8 wickets.  In the return match at the Higher Common Ground, Tunbridge Wells, he was dismissed for a single run in Sussex's first-innings by Willsher, while in their second-innings he batted down the order at number eleven and finished unbeaten on 0.  Kent won the match by 34 runs.

He died at the town of his birth in 1873, aged 33 or 34.

References

External links
William Sherwin at ESPNcricinfo
William Sherwin at CricketArchive

1839 births
1873 deaths
People from Petworth
English cricketers
Sussex cricketers